The 1923 Colorado Silver and Gold football team was an American football team that represented the University of Colorado as a member of the Rocky Mountain Conference (RMC) during the 1923 college football season. In its fourth season under head coach Myron E. Witham, the team compiled a perfect 9–0 record (7–0 against RMC opponents), won the RMC championship, and outscored opponents by a total of 280 to 27. Colorado's 1923 season was part of a 19-game unbeaten streak that began on November 23, 1922, and ended on January 1, 1925.

The conference championship was decided in the final game of the season with the annual rivalry game against Colorado Agricultural. Colorado won the game, 6–3. Neither team scored a touchdown, and Colorado won by kicking its second field goal with 45 seconds remaining in the game. The conference championship was Colorado's first since Fred Folsom's 1913 Colorado team.

Quarterback Art Quinlan was the team captain who led the team's passing attack and also handled kicking duties. Four Colorado players received first-team honors on the 1923 All-Rocky Mountain Conference football team: halfback Fred Hartshorn; end Jack Healy; guard William McGlone; and tackle Douglas McLean.

The team played its home games at Gamble Field in Boulder, Colorado.

Schedule

Game summaries

Western State

Only three first-string players from the 1922 Colorado football team returned in 1923. Accordingly, coach Witham and his staff were required to draw on untested players to develop the 1923 roster. In order to test the candidates at each position, coach Witham sent 35 players into the game. Colorado won by a 51-0 score.

Colorado Teachers
On October 13, Colorado rolled to its second impressive victory, defeating  by a 60-0 score.  Using a balanced rushing and passing attack, Colorado scored nine touchdowns. G. E. Helmer, sports editor of the Silver and Gold described the team in action against the Teachers as "the smoothest-running team that had worn the Silver and Gold for many years."

BYU
On October 20, Colorado defeated BYU, 41–0, for its third consecutive shutout victory. Colorado relied heavily on its passing offense, using "strange formations" that left BYU bewildered. G. E. Helmer wrote: "The Mormons could not fathom the overhead game launched by Quinlan with Handy, Healy, Bohn, and Hartshorn on the receiving ends."

at Denver
On October 27, Colorado defeated Denver, 21–7, on a muddy field in Denver. Colorado's offense was led by the rushing of halfback Fred Hartshorn and the passing of quarterback Arthur Quinlan.  Denver's only score came on a 60-yard interception return in the third quarter. G. E. Helmer described the field condition as "deplorable" and wrote: "The mud was six inches deep on all parts of the field except a strip fifteen yards wide which ran down the center." Despite the field conditions, Colorado completed 15 of 30 passes for 206 yards.

Colorado College
The game was played on a wet field in Boulder. Quinlan kicked a field goal and was credited with "uncanny ability at tossing a wet and slippery ball." Hatfield Chilson had the play of the game, returning a kickoff to Colorado College's one-yard line.

vs. Colorado Mines
Colorado scored seven touchdowns in the game. Quinlan broke two bones in his right hand, and he was replaced at quarterback by Hatfield Chilson who "proved an accurate passer and a flashy runner."

at Utah
On November 17, Colorado defeated Utah, 17–7, before a record crowd of 12,000 spectators at Cummings Field in Salt Lake City. Chilson started at quarterback in place of the injured Quinlan.  With Utah leading, Colorado lined up for a field goal to be kicked by Quinlan with his arm in a sling.  The ball was snapped to Chilson who threw a touchdown pass to Bohn to tie the score. Earl Loser scored Colorado's second touchdown, and Quinlan kicked a field goal to give Colorado its final tally of 17 points. Hartshorn also returned a kick 60 yards but was caught from behind. G. E. Helmer praised Chilson's performance at quarterback: "Chilson, with his accurate passing, generalship, and flashy running, proved himself to be quite capable of filling the quarterback position."

Wyoming
On November 24, Colorado defeated Wyoming, 20–3, at Gamble Field in Boulder.  Coach Witham played the second string against Wyoming.

at Colorado Agricultural
On Thanksgiving, November 27, Colorado met Colorado Agricultural at Colorado Field in Fort Collins for their annual rivalry game. Colorado entered the game with several players injured, including halfback William Bohn (broken wrist), tackle Douglas McLean (broken nose), end Richard Handy (sprained ankle), and quarterback Arthur Quinlan (broken throwing hand). Both teams were undefeated against conference opponents, and the winner would be crowned as the conference champion.

Colorado won by a 6–3 score as neither team scored a touchdown, and both teams were limited to field goals. Though not fully healed, team captain Arthur Quinlan returned to the quarterback position and kicked both Colorado field goals. The final, game-winning field goal was set up by "a spectacular dash" by Quinlan "who threw off four Aggie tacklers and raced 63 yards before being stopped." Quinlan then kicked the ball through the cross-bars with only 45 seconds remaining in the game. G. E. Helmer opined that the match was "one of the greatest games ever played in this conference." The victory gave Colorado its first conference championship in 10 years.

Post-season
On November 30, 1923, the All-Rocky Mountain Conference football team selected by the conference coaches was announced.  Four Colorado players were named to the first team: halfback Fred Hartshorn; end Jack Healy; guard William McGlone; and tackle Douglas McLean. Three more players were named to the second team: quarterback Arthur Quinlan; halfback William Bohn; and fullback Earl Loser.

On December 3, 1923, the team held its banquet in Boulder. Varsity letters were presented, and halfback Fred Hartshorn was elected by secret ballot as the 1924 team captain. Fullback Earl Loser was elected vice-captain.

Roster
The team's roster included 18 players who were awarded varsity "C" letters for their efforts.  The 18 letter winners were:
 William Bohn - halfback (second-team all-conference 1923)
 Hatfield Chilson - quarterback
 Richard Handy - end
 Fred Hartshorn - halfback (first-team all-conference 1923, captain of the 1924 team)
 Jack Healy - end (first-team all-conference 1923)
 Fred Johnson - end
 Donald Keim
 Earl Loser - fullback (second-team all-conference 1923)
 William McGlone - guard (first-team all-conference 1923)
 Douglas McLean - tackle (first-team all-conference 1922-1923)
 William McNary - center
 Kenneth Mead - guard
 Dwight Nichols
 William Plested - tackle
 Arthur Quinlan - captain and quarterback (second-team all-conference 1923)
 Kenneth Sawyer - guard
 Paul Steward
 George Touhy

Others who played for the team but did not receive varsity letters included:
 Scoville - center
 Dickerman - utility

Coaching staff
 Myron Witham - head coach
 Walter B. Franklin - line coach
 C. C. Johnson - assistant coach (freshman football)
 Knowles - assistant coach
 Alva Noggle - assistant coach
 Wolcott - assistant coach
 Edward Montgomery - manager

References

Colorado
Colorado Buffaloes football seasons
Rocky Mountain Athletic Conference football champion seasons
College football undefeated seasons
Colorado Silver and Gold football